The Mark 30 mine was an aircraft-launched, antisubmarine torpedo developed by the Brush Development Company during World War II. It was developed as a backup for the Mark 24 mine due to apprehensions regarding the Mark 24's acoustic steering. Three prototypes of the Mark 30 were built and tested in 1943; results were satisfactory. Production of the Mark 30 was never undertaken due to the success of the Mark 24 mine's acoustic steering.

See also
Mark 24 mine
Mark 30 torpedo

References

Torpedoes
Torpedoes of the United States
Unmanned underwater vehicles